Area codes 204, 431, and 584 are telephone area codes in the North American Numbering Plan (NANP) for the entire Canadian province of Manitoba. Area code 204 is one of the original North American area codes assigned in 1947, and 431 and 584 were assigned to the same numbering plan area (NPA) in 2012 and 2022, respectively, to form an overlay.

History
When the American Telephone and Telegraph Company (AT&T) designed the first comprehensive North American telephone numbering plan in the 1940s, Manitoba was designated as a single numbering plan area (NPA) with area code 204.

In 2009, the Canadian Numbering Administrator forecast that area code 204 would be exhausted within a few years even though there were only 1.2 million people in the entire province. An area code provides about 7.8 million telephone numbers, but Canada uses an allocation scheme that allots all ten thousand numbers of a central office prefix to competitive local exchange carriers even for the smallest hamlets. Canada does not implement number pooling. Therefore, once a number is allocated to a rate centre, it cannot be reassigned elsewhere even if a rate centre has more than enough numbers to service it. The number exhaustion was caused by the proliferation of cell phones, particularly in and around Winnipeg.

In July 2010, the Canadian Radio-television and Telecommunications Commission approved a province-wide overlay with area code 431 for implementation in November 2012. On July 30, 2012, 10-digit dialing became mandatory throughout the province. Although that had the effect of allocating about 15.6 million numbers to a province of just over 1.2 million people, MTS and other carriers in the province preferred that method to a geographical split, which would have seen one part of the province retain area code 204 and another part receive the new area code 431. The province's telephone companies wanted to spare Manitobans the expense and burden of changing telephone numbers.

Area code 584 was reserved as a third area code for the region in February 2017. It was implemented on October 29, 2022.

The incumbent local exchange carrier for the area codes is Bell MTS.

Service area and central office codes

 Premium services: 1+(204/431/584) 976.
 Alexander (204) 752, 852
 Alonsa (204) 767
 Anola (204) 866
 Arborg (204) 376, 494, 498
 Altona (204) 216, 217, 304, 319, 324
 Amaranth (204) 843
 Austin (204) 637, (431)-300 
 Baldur (204) 535
 Beausejour (204) 268, (431)-218
 Brandon (204) 321, 402, 441, 455, 520, 570, 571, 573, 574, 578, 579, 580, 581, 596, 650, 717, 720, 721, 724, 725, 726, 727, 728, 729, 730, 740, 761, 901, 922, (431) 210, 308, 432, 483, 540
 Bissett (204) 277, (431) 226
 Boissevain (204) 305, 534, 552
 Carberry (204) 703, 834, 844, (431) 219
 Carman (204) 497, 715, 745, 750, 751, (431) 237
 Cartwright (204) 529
 Churchill (204) 675, (431) 232 971
 Clear Lake (204) 848, (431) 321
 Crandall 562
 Cromer (204) 556
 Cross Lake (204) 676, (431) 230
 Cypress River (204) 743
 Darlingford 246
 Dauphin (204) 547 572 592 621 622 629 630 638 647 648 672 701, (431) 220 401
 Dugald (204) 419 853 860
 Deloraine (204) 696, 747 (431) 236
 Easterville (431) 227
 Edwin (204) 252 839
 Elgin (204) 769
 Elie (204) 353
 Elkhorn (204) 845
 Ethelbert (204) 742
 Flin Flon (204) 271 680 681 687 923 991, (431)-217
 Fisher Branch (204) 372
 Gillam (204) 652, (431) 285
 Gimli (204) 642 671, (431) 641
 Gladstone (204) 385 
 Glenboro (204) 827
 Goodlands (204) 658
 Grand Beach (431) 228
 Gretna (204) 327
 Hamiota (204) 764, (431) 235
 Hartney (204) 616 858
 Holland (204) 526, (431) 225
 Kenton (204) 838
 Killarney (204) 523 600 (431) 234
 Lac du Bonnet (204) 213 340 345 350 459
 Letellier (204) 737
 Lockport (204) 757
 Lorette (204) 270 878 961
 Lyleton (204) 649
 MacGregor (204) 685
 Manitou (204) 242, (431) 284
 McAuley (204) 722
 Medora and Napinka (204) 665
 Melita (204) 264 522 551 576 591
 Miami (204) 435
 Miniota (204) 567
 Minnedosa (204) 210 705 867 868 907
 Minto (204) 776
 Morden (204) 501 812 822 823 (431) 216 486 487 775
 Morris (204) 209 561 712 714 746 921
 Neepawa (204) 212 463 476 704 841 916, (431) 221
 Ninette (204) 528
 Niverville (204) 388 503 530 540 542 544
 Norway House (204) 301 359
 Notre-Dame-de-Lourdes (204) 248

 Oakbank  (204) 403 443 444 446 506 541 606 816 817 818 819 900 902 
 Oakville  (204) 267 964
 Oak Lake (204) 855
 Oxford House (431) 231
 Pierson (204) 634
 Pilot Mound (204) 208 245 825
 Pinawa (204) 753
 Pine Falls (204) 317 367 830
 Pipestone (204)  854
 Plumas (204) 386
 Portage la Prairie (204) 239 240 249 309 400 515 521 595 692 814 850 856 857 870 871 872 892 903, (431) 251 400
 Reston (204) 577 662 877
 Rivers (204) 303 328 398 412 710
 Riverton (204) 378, (431) 283
 Roblin (204) 207 247 465 917 937
 Roland (204) 343
 Rossburn (204) 859
 Russell (204) 773 796 821 
 Sanford (204) 405 418 508 706 736 
 Selkirk (204) 260 406 420 444 481 482 485 492 498 527 549 785 904 909 971 994, (431) 238 484
 Snowflake (204) 876
 Souris (204) 413 483 709 741
 Sperling (204) 626
 St. Adolphe (204) 883
 St. Eustache (204) 353
 St. Francois Xavier (204) 864
 St-Pierre-Jolys (204) 433
 Ste. Anne (204) 401 422
 Ste Rose du Lac (204) 496 613, (431) 233
 Starbuck (204) 735, (431)-301
 Steinbach (204) 300 320 321 326 346 355 370 371 380 381 392 408 543 846 905 912 972 993 (431)-205 215
 Stonewall (204) 404 454 461 464 467 490 507 513 906 (431)- 223 302
 Stony Mountain (204) 344 530
 Strathclair (204) 365, (431) 282 973
 Swan Lake (204) 836 974
 Swan River (204) 236 238 281 518 524 525 539 569 614 733 734, (431) 281
 Teulon (204) 206 861 886
 The Pas (204) 617 620 623 627 969 978, (431) 229 239
 Thompson (204) 307 550 598 670 674 677 679 778 939 970 (431) 224
 Treherne (204) 608 693 713 723
 Vidir (204) 364
 Virden (204) 491 512 707 718 748 851 908 (431) 645
 Waskada (204) 673
 Whitemouth (204) 348
 Winkler (204) 312 325 331 332 361 362 384 493 502 531 542 (431) 240
 Winnipeg (204) 200 201 202 218 219 220 221 222 223 224 225 226 227 228 229 230 231 232 233 235 237 250 251 253 254 255 256 257 258 259 260 261 262 269 272 275 282 283 284 285 287 289 290 291 292 293 294 295 296 297 298 299 318 330 333 334 336 338 339 360 390 391 396 399 410 414 415 416 417 421 430 451 452 453 470 471 474 475 477 478 479 480 487 488 489 499 500 504 505 509 510 514 515 557 558 560 582 583 586 588 589 590 594 599 612 615 619 631 632 633 654 661 663 666 667 668 669 688 691 694 695 697 698 760 770 771 772 774 775 777 779 780 781 782 783 784 786 787 788 789 790 791 792 793 794 795 797 798 799 800 801 802 803 804 805 806 807 808 809 813 815 831 832 833 837 869 880 881 885 887 888 889 890 891 894 895 896 897 898 899 910 914 915 918 919 920 924 925 926 927 928 929 930 931 932 933 934 935 936 938 940 941 942 943 944 945 946 947 948 949 951 952 953 954 955 956 957 958 959 960 962 963 975 977 979 981 982 983 984 985 986 987 988 989 990 992 995 996 997 998 999 (431) 200 206 222 317 334 335 336 338 420 421 422 423 424 425 426 427 428 429 433 451 485 777 800 802 845 846 847 848 944 990 996 997 998 999
 Winnipeg Beach (204) 389

Calls to the following communities can be direct-dialed from Winnipeg as a local call: Dugald, Lockport, Lorette, Oakbank, St. Adolphe, St. Francois Xavier, Sanford, Starbuck, Stonewall, and Stony Mountain.

See also 

 Telephone numbers in Canada

References

External links
CNA exchange list for area +1-204
CNA exchange list for area +1-431
CNA exchange list for area +1-584
Area Code Map of Canada

204
Area codes
Communications in Nunavut
Area codes